The Sanitarium Lake Bridges Historic District encompasses a pair of stone arch bridges on Carroll County Road 317 (Lake Lucerne Road) in southern Eureka Springs, Arkansas. Built in 1891 by the Eureka Sanitarium Company to provide access to its resort, they are the only known stone arch bridges in the county, and two of a small number of known surviving stone arch bridges in the entire state. Both bridges are single-span arches fashioned out of cut stone.

The district was listed on the National Register of Historic Places in 2010.

See also
List of bridges documented by the Historic American Engineering Record in Arkansas
List of bridges on the National Register of Historic Places in Arkansas
National Register of Historic Places listings in Carroll County, Arkansas

References

External links

Road bridges on the National Register of Historic Places in Arkansas
Bridges completed in 1891
Historic American Engineering Record in Arkansas
Historic districts on the National Register of Historic Places in Arkansas
National Register of Historic Places in Carroll County, Arkansas
Stone arch bridges in the United States